Automated bid managers (ABMs) are advertising tools used to manage budgets on pay per click (PPC) campaigns. ABMs allow users to prioritize keywords listings and bids. Many ABMs have timestamp controls as well position monitors. ABMs are designed to allow a user either to maintain a certain position on a PPC list or to keep to a specific budget. ABMs come in a variety of formats and can be customized to meet the scale of an application. 

Online advertising